8th congressional district may refer to:
Alabama's 8th congressional district (defunct)
Arizona's 8th congressional district
California's 8th congressional district
Florida's 8th congressional district
Georgia's 8th congressional district
Illinois's 8th congressional district
Indiana's 8th congressional district
Iowa's 8th congressional district (defunct)
Kansas's 8th congressional district (defunct)
Kentucky's 8th congressional district (defunct)
Louisiana's 8th congressional district (defunct)
Maine's 8th congressional district (defunct)
Maryland's 8th congressional district
Massachusetts's 8th congressional district
Michigan's 8th congressional district
Minnesota's 8th congressional district
Mississippi's 8th congressional district (defunct)
Missouri's 8th congressional district
New Jersey's 8th congressional district
New York's 8th congressional district
North Carolina's 8th congressional district
Oklahoma's 8th congressional district (defunct)
Pennsylvania's 8th congressional district
South Carolina's 8th congressional district (defunct)
Tennessee's 8th congressional district
Texas's 8th congressional district
Virginia's 8th congressional district
Washington's 8th congressional district
Wisconsin's 8th congressional district